Tai Daeng (or Red Tai) can refer to:

Tai Daeng language, a Tai language of northern Vietnam
Tai Daeng people, an ethnic group of Vietnam